Schizocerella pilicornis, commonly known as the purslane sawfly or portulaca sawfly, is a species of sawfly in the family Argidae. The larva is a leaf miner on Common Purslane.

References

Further reading

 

Argidae
Articles created by Qbugbot